Niš Bus Station is the main bus station in Niš, Serbia. The station is a hub for urban transit and intercity carrier Niš-Ekspres.

Buses from Niš to Belgrade, the capital of Serbia, run every 30 minutes. Direct bus lines are available, as well as buses that stop in multiple cities on the way.

References

 https://getbybus.com/en/blog/buses-nis/

Bus stations in Serbia